Seranation is an American pop, reggae rock band from Treasure Island, St. Petersburg, Florida.

The band's music features a 'unique blend of pop-reggae/rock' that they labeled as "Tropical-Rock" from their sunny surroundings.

History

Formation (2015)
Seranation was formed in 2015, by guitarist Adam Hocker and bassist Bianca Schlosser formally from the reggae band, Roots For Change. Shortly after, the met up with lead singer J. Carter Gleason (or simply "J") who auditioned for them by singing the Sublime song "Garden Grove". Next, they needed a name to represent the members diverse musical backgrounds. It was J. Carter who came up with the band's name. After singing about a co-worker named Sarah. He kept singing, "It's like a Sarah-nation!" And that was it, "Seranation" was born out of the word "serenade". Later on, they added Josh Baron on drums and Beard Bruce on keyboard and saxophone, as well as guitarist Colin Smith.

Island Thinkin (2015)
The band recorded their first full-length studio album, Island Thinkin on September 17, 2015  as a self-produced release. The 10-track debut features singles, "What Up!" and "Flip Side", as well as the title song.

Livin' the Dream (2018)
Seranation recorded their second studio album titled, Livin' the Dream on March 23, 2018. The 10-track follow-up was released on Pepper's LAW Records, working with Josh Saldate and Greg Shields, lead singer of label-mates Kash'd Out, recording at Sound Lounge Studios. J. Carter explains the album's name, "We were trying to inspire people. When you're down and out, keep pushing through. We want to spread good vibes with it. We want people to know they're capable of making their dreams happen, just as we are doing the same thing. It's us really committing to living the dream." The band really brings their "Florida vibes" with them in this album. Adam added, "There is a deeper message than just the Floridian lifestyle, a responsibility when creating music." The band also added guitarist Matt Knabe after Smith left.

Compilation and singles (2019–present)
In 2021, Seranation was one of several reggae rock and punk bands on The House That Bradley Built, a charity compilation honoring Sublime's lead singer Bradley Nowell, helping musicians with substance abuse. They covered Sublime's song "Ebin" on the Deluxe Edition which was released on January 12, 2021.

The band also recorded and released several singles over the years, along with music videos. Some singles include, "Sweet Tempation", "Dangerous", and "Surfboard", which were co-written and produced by Rome Ramirez of Sublime with Rome, which were released under his own record label, Fresh Goods. 

Seranation are currently working on their next studio album release in 2023.

Touring

Well-known in their home state, Seranation have played and headlined at multiple local venues and festivals throughout the Sunshine State. As their popularity grew throughout the years, the band shared the stage with Ballyhoo!, Dirty Heads, Fortunate Youth, Florida's own and label mates, Kingston, Natural Vibrations, Resinated, Shwayze, Stick Figure and Three Legged Fox. Their first nationwide 8-state tour was the "None Escape the Law Tour" alongside Tunnel Vision and Orlando's own Kash'd Out starting at Reggae Rise Up Florida Festival in the band's hometown. In 2019, the band went on another nationwide tour supporting fellow reggae rock bands Sublime with Rome, Michael Franti, SOJA, and Common Kings.

Musical Influences

Seranation's blend of reggae/rock fusion along with their catchy pop melodies is inspired by their different musical styles. For Bianca it was a mix of artists from the 70's; from Jimi Hendrix to their contemporaries like The Expendables and Slightly Stoopid. J's was inspired by the Red Hot Chili Peppers and especially Sublime who's CD was in constant rotation that he listened to a 'million times', which he said "reawakened his dream" of becoming a musician. Adam got a chance to meet his greatest inspiration; guitarist Raul Bianchi from The Expendables who taught him how to perfect his craft as a musician.

Lineup

Current members
J. Carter Gleason – lead singer (2015–present)
Adam Hocker – guitar, backup vocals (2015–present)
Bianca Schlosser – bass, backup vocals (2015–present)
Josh Hasak – drums (2018–present)

Past members
Josh Baron – drums, percussion (2015–2018)
Beard Bruce – keyboard, saxophone (2015–2018)
Colin Smith – guitar (2015–2017)
Matt Knabe – guitar (2018–2020)

Discography

Studio albums

Singles

References

External links

Musical groups from Florida
American reggae musical groups
American pop rock music groups
Reggae rock groups